Freeing Bernie Baran is an independent documentary feature film produced by Daniel Alexander and Tom Opferman. The film chronicles the 25-year span from 1984 to 2009 in the criminal court case of "The Commonwealth of Massachusetts versus Bernard F. Baran, Jr."

Bernard Baran was the first person convicted in the day care sex abuse hysteria of the 1980s and 1990s in the United States. The film uses interviews and court documents to show the consequences of homophobia and political ambition. Homophobia played such a significant role in the Baran case that the judge freeing him two decades later equated it with the other dominant aspects of day care panic cases: hysteria and suggestion.

Freeing Bernie Baran made its world premiere on September 11, 2010 at the Austin Gay & Lesbian International Film Festival (aGLIFF23) with Bernie Baran and director Daniel Alexander in attendance. The aGLIFF23 festival guide described the film as "achingly beautiful" and said "if you can only see one film at the festival, this is the one to see" concluding "it will make you angry but leave you with hope.

References

External links 

 
 The Austin Gay & Lesbian International Film Festival Program Guide

2010 films
2010 documentary films
American documentary films
Day care sexual abuse allegations in the United States
Documentary films about miscarriage of justice in the United States
American independent films
American LGBT-related films
2010s English-language films
2010s American films